David Gonzalvez (born October 29, 1987) is an American professional basketball player for Tampereen Pyrintö in the Finnish Korisliiga. Standing at 1.93 m (6 ft 4 in), Gonzalvez usually plays at the shooting guard position.

Career
Gonzalvez played four years for the Richmond Spiders men's basketball team before turning professional in 2010. In his first season, he played for Nantes in the LNB Pro B in France and for the Oberwart Gunners from Austria. In the 2011–2012 season, he played for EiffelTowers Den Bosch from the Netherlands. With the team he won the Dutch national championship. In 2012, he signed with WBC Raiffeisen Wels. In 2013, he returned to Den Bosch to play for the team, that was renamed the SPM Shoeters, again.

For the 2014–15 season he signed with Namika Lahti of the Finnish Korisliiga. In October 2015, Gonzalvez signed with Kouvot in the same Korisliiga.

On July 19, 2016, Gonzalvez signed with the German club MHP Riesen Ludwigsburg.

On January 2, 2017, Gonzalvez transferred to medi bayreuth.

Honors
SPM Shoeters Den Bosch
Dutch Championship (2012)
Dutch Supercup (2013)
2x DBL All-Star (2012, 2014)
DBL steals leader (2012)
WBC Raiffeisen Wels
Austrian Championship (2011)
Kouvot
Korisliiga (2016)

References

External links
Eurobasket profile
Dutch Basketball League profile
Richmond Spiders bio

1987 births
Living people
American expatriate basketball people in Austria
American expatriate basketball people in Finland
American expatriate basketball people in France
American expatriate basketball people in Germany
American expatriate basketball people in the Netherlands
American men's basketball players
Basketball players from Marietta, Georgia
Heroes Den Bosch players
Dutch Basketball League players
Flyers Wels players
Kouvot players
Tampereen Pyrintö players
Medi Bayreuth players
Riesen Ludwigsburg players
Namika Lahti players
Richmond Spiders men's basketball players
SC Rasta Vechta players
Shooting guards